Admiro (Miro) Allione (December 20, 1932 – January 14, 2006) was an Italian executive who has been serving as managing director of STET and founder, President and CEO of Stream

Before being involved in telecommunications he was a professor of mathematics and urban planning. He also wrote many books about economics and mathematics.

Biography 
Miro Allione was born 20 December 1932 in Milan, he was the first son of Abramo Allione, an Italian composer, publisher and record producer. The name "Admiro" was mistakenly registered to the local register office and was never changed into "Miro", name that he always used.

He graduated at university in mathematics and economics in 1961 and then started a career as a mathematics professor, also writing economics essays and books.

In 1984 he entered the STET, a leading Italian telecommunications company. Then in the 1990 he is promoted to managing director of the company.

In 1993 he leaves the STET to create Stream S.P.A., a television company service provider of Stream TV, that will become the second Pay TV in Italy, until the fusion with TELE+ and the creation of SKY Italia. He served as President and CEO of Stream until 1999.

In 1999, after leaving Stream S.P.A. he joined the Board of Directors of Systeam S.P.A., an Italian company based on e-systems integrators with an extensive portfolio of blue chip clients.<ref>{{cite web|url=https://www.thefreelibrary.com/ci4net.com+Acquires+Systeam%2c+a+Leading+Italian+E-Systems+Integrator%3b...-a061398219|title=ci4net.com Acquires Systeam, a Leading Italian E-Systems Integrator; Prof. Admiro Allione, ex-CEO of Stream Joins the Board of Directors of Systeam.|publisher=	PR Newswire|accessdate=April 5, 2017|date=April 7, 2000|language=English}}</ref>

Form 2001 he was the CEO of Marine Contractor, a company working for Fincantieri in the construction of cruise ships.

During his life he wrote books, some essays, many articles on journals (in particular on il manifesto) and specialized magazines, covering mathematics, economics, and tele-communications themes.
He was also often interviewed on radios (such as Radio Radicale) and television about those topics.

 Personal life 
Miro Allione had two sons from his first marriage, Sandro and Andrea. After the divorce from his first wife, on the 16th of April, 1992 he married Anna Maramao, with whom he had another son, Marco.

He was a great lover of tennis, a sport he practiced very often, even participating in some amateur tournaments. In particular he is remembered to winning a Maserati Biturbo Spyder (Tipo AM333) at the 1991 tournament of the Società Ginnastica Roma''.

He died in Rome, in January 2006, after some months in hospital. After the cremation, his ashes were scattered in the woods near Orvieto, an area of Umbria that he loved very much in the last years of his life and where he owned a country house with his wife Anna Maramao.

Related voices 
STET – Società Finanziaria Telefonica
Stream TV
Pay television

References 

Italian chief executives
1932 births
2006 deaths
Businesspeople from Milan